Alan Newell may refer to:

 Alan C. Newell (born 1941), Irish/American mathematician
 Alan Newell (English computer scientist), professor at Dundee University

See also

 Allen Newell (1927–1992), researcher in computer science and cognitive psychology